Head of Christ is a 1940 portrait painting of Jesus by Warner Sallman.

Head of Christ may also refer to:
 Head of Christ (Cascalls), a c.1352 alabaster sculpture in the Museu Nacional d'Art de Catalunya, Barcelona
 Head of Christ (Correggio), a 1521 painting in the Getty Museum, Los Angeles
 Head of Christ (Leonardo), a c.1494 chalk and pastel study in the Pinacoteca di Brera, Milan
 Head of Christ (Rembrandt), a 1648 oil-on-panel painting in the Gemäldegalerie, Berlin
 Head of Christ (Rembrandt, Louvre Abu Dhabi), a c.1648 painting
 Head of Christ (Rembrandt, New York), a 1650s painting in the Metropolitan Museum of Art
 Head of Christ (Rembrandt, Philadelphia),  a 17th-century painting in the Philadelphia Museum of Art